Šlovrenc is a village in the Municipality of Brda in the Littoral region of Slovenia, close to the border with Italy.

The parish church, from which the settlement also gets its name, is dedicated to Saint Lawrence and belongs to the Koper Diocese.

References

External links

Šlovrenc on Geopedia

Populated places in the Municipality of Brda